Doteng Gewog (Dzongkha: རྡོ་སྟེང་) is a gewog (village block) of Paro District, Bhutan. In 2002, the gewog had an area of 193.1 square kilometres and contained eight villages and 143 households.

References 

Gewogs of Bhutan
Paro District